Egor Koulechov (born November 5, 1994) is an Israeli-Russian professional basketball player for Hapoel Be'er Sheva of the Israeli Basketball Premier League. He played college basketball for Arizona State, Rice, and Florida before playing professionally in Israel.

Early life
Koulechov was born in Volgograd, Russia, and is Jewish. Koulechov lived his first 6 years in Russia before growing up in Kibbutz Neve Ur, Israel. He played for Maccabi Rishon LeZion youth team and Wingate Institute Academy.

In 2011, Koulechov moved to the United States, where he enrolled at Sagemont in Weston, Florida, and played for the basketball team in the 2011–12 and 2012–13 seasons.

College career
Koulechov began his college career at Arizona State, where he averaged 3.7 points and 2.8 rebounds while shooting 43.8 percent from the field. On June 4, 2014, Koulechov left for Rice after his freshman season but sat out first season per NCAA Transfer rules.

In the 2016–17 season, Koulechov earned first-team All-Conference USA and Second Team NABC All-District 11 honors as a junior at Rice. He was also named two-time Conference USA Player of the Week, Koulechov ranked second on the team and fifth in Conference USA with 18.2 points.

Koulechov graduated from Rice in 2017 with one season of NCAA eligibility remaining; under NCAA rules, he had the option of remaining at Rice or enrolling in a graduate program elsewhere and finishing out his college basketball career at the new school. Accordingly, he announced on April 19, 2017 that he would play at Florida as a graduate transfer.

In his senior year at Florida, Koulechov led the team with 6.4 rebounds per game and ranked second with 13.8 points per game. He had six games with 20+ points and nine games with at least three 3-pointers made.

Professional career

2018–19 season
After going undrafted in the 2018 NBA draft, Koulechov joined the Minnesota Timberwolves for the 2018 NBA Summer League.

On August 9, 2018, Koulechov started his professional career with Maccabi Rishon LeZion, signing a two-year deal. In October 2018, Koulechov won the 2018 Israeli League Cup with Rishon LeZion. In 26 Israeli League games played for Rishon LeZion, he averaged 11.5 points, 5.3 rebounds and 1.5 assists per game.

On April 17, 2019, Koulechov was loaned to Hapoel Holon for the rest of the season, joining as an injury cover for Guy Pnini.

2019–20 season
On August 15, 2019, Koulechov signed with Ironi Nahariya for the 2019–20 season.

2020–21 season
On November 25, 2020, he has signed with UNICS Kazan of the VTB United League.

2021–22 season
On July 7, 2021, Koulechov re-joined Maccabi Rishon LeZion. On January 22, 2022, Koulechov signed with Hapoel Tel Aviv.

2022–23 season
On July 18, 2022, he signed with Hapoel Be'er Sheva of the Israeli Basketball Premier League.

National team career
Koulechov was a member of the Israeli U-16, U-18 and U-20 national teams.

In July 2013, he averaged 12.0 points and 4.6 rebounds for the U-20 squad, leading his team with a 93.5 free throw percentage as well as 1.7 steals per game. The team claimed 15th place in the 2013 FIBA Europe Under-20 Championship.

Career statistics

College

|-
| style="text-align:left;"| 2013–14
| style="text-align:left;"| Arizona State
| 27 || 7 || 14.0 || .438 || .333 || .679 || 2.8 || 0.5 || 0.3 || 0.2 || 3.7
|-
| style="text-align:left;"| 2015–16
| style="text-align:left;"| Rice
| 32 || 32 || 34.4 || .417 || .343 || .862 || 7.0 || 1.3 || 0.8 || 0.1 || 16.7
|-
| style="text-align:left;"| 2016–17
| style="text-align:left;"| Rice
| 35 || 35 || 34.0 || .474 || .474 || .819 || 8.8 || 2.1 || 0.8 || 0.3 || 18.2
|-
| style="text-align:left;"| 2017–18
| style="text-align:left;"| Florida
| 34 || 34 || 30.6 || .414 || .398 || .864 || 6.4 || 1.1 || 0.5 || 0.1 || 13.7
|-
| style="text-align:center;" colspan="2" | Career
| 128 || 108 || 29.0 || .436 || .395 || .832 || 6.4 || 1.3 || 0.6 || 0.2 || 13.6

Source: RealGM

References

External links
 Florida Gators bio
 RealGM profile
 FIBA profile
 IBSL profile

1994 births
Living people
Arizona State Sun Devils men's basketball players
BC UNICS players
Florida Gators men's basketball players
Hapoel Be'er Sheva B.C. players
Hapoel Holon players
Hapoel Tel Aviv B.C. players
Ironi Nahariya players
Israeli expatriate basketball people in the United States
Israeli Jews
Israeli men's basketball players
Jewish men's basketball players
Maccabi Rishon LeZion basketball players
Rice Owls men's basketball players
Russian expatriate basketball people in the United States
Russian Jews
Russian men's basketball players
Shooting guards
Small forwards
Sportspeople from Volgograd